Çağlayan is a village in the Fındıklı District, Rize Province, in Black Sea Region of Turkey. Its population is 515 (2021).

History 
According to list of villages in Laz language book (2009), name of the village is Ab-ı Ulya, which means "upper stream". Most villagers are ethnically Laz.

Geography

References

Villages in Fındıklı District
Laz settlements in Turkey